Wolverhampton North East is a borough constituency represented in the House of Commons of the Parliament of the United Kingdom. It elects one Member of Parliament (MP) by the first past the post system of election. It is currently represented by Jane Stevenson of the Conservative Party, who was elected at the 2019 general election.

Members of Parliament

Boundaries
Wolverhampton North East is one of three constituencies covering the city of Wolverhampton, covering the northern and north-eastern parts of the city. The boundaries run east from the city centre towards Willenhall and north-west towards Tettenhall. The Conservatives are strongest in Oxley, Bushbury North and the two Wednesfield wards, with the remaining areas more favourable to Labour.

2010–present: The City of Wolverhampton wards of Bushbury North, Bushbury South and Low Hill, Fallings Park, Heath Town, Oxley, Wednesfield North, and Wednesfield South.

1983–2010: The Metropolitan Borough of Wolverhampton wards of Bushbury, Fallings Park, Heath Town, Low Hill, Oxley, Wednesfield North, and Wednesfield South.

1974–1983: The County Borough of Wolverhampton wards of Bushbury, Eastfield, Low Hill, Oxley, Wednesfield Heath, Wednesfield North, and Wednesfield South.

1955–1974: The County Borough of Wolverhampton wards of Bushbury, Dunstall, Heath Town, Low Hill, St James', St Mary's, and St Peter's.

1950–1955: The County Borough of Wolverhampton wards of Bushbury, Dunstall, Heath Town, Low Hill, Park, St James', St Mary's, and St Peter's.

History
Wolverhampton North East was notable in the 1987 general election for being one of only a small number of seats that the Conservatives gained from Labour. It reverted to type, however, at the 1992 general election, when the Labour MP Ken Purchase first took office. It is one of the 'traditional' Labour seats that elected a Conservative MP at the 2019 general election, helping Prime Minister Boris Johnson achieve a majority of 80.

Elections

Elections in the 2010s

]]

UKIP originally selected Simon Ellis as candidate in 2015.

Elections in the 2000s

Elections in the 1990s

Elections in the 1980s

Elections in the 1970s

Elections in the 1960s

Elections in the 1950s

See also
List of Members of Parliament for Wolverhampton
List of parliamentary constituencies in Wolverhampton
List of parliamentary constituencies in the West Midlands (county)

References

External links
United Kingdom Election Results 

Parliamentary constituencies in Wolverhampton
Parliamentary constituencies in the West Midlands (county)
Constituencies of the Parliament of the United Kingdom established in 1950